Khakhita is a rural locality (a selo) in Levashinsky District, Republic of Dagestan, Russia. The population was 1,165 as of 2010. There are 13 streets.

Geography 
Khakhita is located 8 km northwest of Levashi (the district's administrative centre) by road. Nizhneye Chugli and Orada Chugli are the nearest rural localities.

Nationalities 
Avars live there.

References 

Rural localities in Levashinsky District